Ogert Muka (born 10 September 1979) is a retired Albanian footballer. During his club career, Muka played for KS Lushnja, KF Teuta Durrës, FK Dinamo Tirana, KF Bylis Ballsh, Flamurtari Vlorë, FK Partizani Tirana and Besa Kavajë. He made 2 appearances for the Albania national team.

International career
He made his debut for Albania in a January 2002 Bahrain Tournament match against Finland and earned a total of 2 caps, scoring no goals. His other international was against Bahrain at the same tournament.

Honours
Albanian Cup: 2002–03

References

External links

 Profile - FSHF

1979 births
Living people
Sportspeople from Lushnjë
Albanian footballers
Albania international footballers
Association football midfielders
KS Lushnja players
KF Teuta Durrës players
FK Dinamo Tirana players
KF Bylis Ballsh players
Flamurtari Vlorë players
FK Partizani Tirana players
Besa Kavajë players
KF Memaliaj players
Kategoria Superiore players
Kategoria e Parë players